The Cedar Grove Open is a defunct tennis tournament that was played on the Grand Prix tennis circuit in 1974. The event was held in Cedar Grove, New Jersey.  Ilie Năstase won the singles title, while Kim Warwick and Steve Siegel partnered to win the doubles title.

Singles

Doubles

References
 Draws on ITF Site

Grand Prix tennis circuit
Defunct tennis tournaments in the United States
ATP Tour